Sharon Mesmer (born in 1960) is a Polish-American poet, fiction writer, essayist and professor of creative writing.  Her poetry collections are Annoying Diabetic Bitch (Combo Books, 2008), The Virgin Formica (Hanging Loose Press, 2008), Vertigo Seeks Affinities (chapbook, Belladonna Books, 2007), Half Angel, Half Lunch (Hard Press, 1998) and Crossing Second Avenue (chapbook, ABJ Press, Tokyo, 1997, published to coincide with a month-long reading tour of Japan sponsored by American Book Jam magazine).  Her fiction collections are Ma Vie à Yonago (Hachette Littératures, Paris, in French translation by Daniel Bismuth, 2005), In Ordinary Time (Hanging Loose Press, 2005) and The Empty Quarter (Hanging Loose Press, 2005).   She teaches in the undergraduate and graduate programs of New York University and The New School.  She has lived in Brooklyn, New York since 1988 and is a distant relative of Franz Anton Mesmer, proponent of animal magnetism (or mesmerism) and Otto Messmer, the American animator best known for creating Felix the Cat.

Career
Mesmer, the daughter of second-generation Polish and German immigrants, was born and raised on the south side of Chicago, in the Back of the Yards neighborhood.  The area, named for its proximity to the infamous Union Stockyards, was the subject of Upton Sinclair's 1906 novel, The Jungle. Her first published works were articles on being a disaffected teenage punk which appeared in the seminal Chicago punk 'zine the Gabba Gabba Gazette while she was a student at St. Joseph High School.  Her first published poems were “The Nordic Skull In Double Exposure” which appeared in  Maureen Owen's New York-based literary magazine, Telephone and “The Anger of Animals” appeared in Intro 12, a magazine of the Association of Writers and Writing Programs.

Mesmer received a B.A. in Writing/English from Columbia College, where she and other female students of the poet Paul Hoover, notably Lydia Tomkiw and Deborah Pintonelli, became instrumental in galvanizing the links between the Chicago poetry and punk music scenes (other prominent local poets at that time included Elaine Equi and Jerome Sala). Mesmer, Pintonelli and poet Connie Deanovich published the literary magazine B City, and later Mesmer, Pintonelli and poet/fiction writer Carl Watson published the broadsheet letter eX.  They were frequent readers at the Get Me High Lounge in the Wicker Park area of Chicago, and early poetry slam competitors (Mesmer was later a slam semi-finalist at the Nuyorican Poets Café in New York).

After Mesmer left Chicago for New York, she became a student of Allen Ginsberg in the Brooklyn College MFA poetry program.  Through Ginsberg's nomination, she was awarded a MacArthur Scholarship (given through the college from a gift by John Ashbery) and represented the college in the Poetry Society of America's “Best of New York Writing Programs.”  Writing about Mesmer's first book, Half Angel, Half Lunch, Ginsberg characterized her work as “always interesting, beautifully bold and vivaciously modern.”  It was through the poet that Mesmer was introduced to Buddhist practice.  Because of her association with Ginsberg, she is considered a post-Beat poet (see Beat Generation).  Her early work also evinces ties to the New York School and post-Language poetry.  By 2003 Mesmer was one of earliest practitioners of flarf poetry, the first poetry movement of the 21st century.  She performed with other members of the flarf collective at the Walker Arts Center in Minneapolis, MN in 2008 and at the Whitney Museum in New York City in 2009, as part of the “Flarf Versus Conceptual” event.  Four of her flarf poems appear in the Postmodern American Poetry: A Norton Anthology (second edition, 2013).

Mesmer lectures and performs her work widely: at the 2010 Iceland Wave Festival in Reykjavik, Iceland; at a reading and panel discussion sponsored by the Danish Writers' Union in 2010; and at the Ovidius Festival at Neptun Beach, Romania, in 2009.  Her work has appeared in Poetry, the Wall Street Journal, New American Writing, the Evergreen Review, Eleven Eleven, and the Brooklyn Rail, among others.  Anthology appearances include I'll Drown My Book: Conceptual Writing By Women (Les Figues, 2012), Poems for the Nation: Edited by Allen Ginsberg (Seven Stories Press, 2000) and The Outlaw Bible of American Poetry (Thunder's Mouth Press, 1999).  Her awards include a Fulbright Specialist grant (2011), an Alumna of the Year Award from Columbia College Chicago (2009), a Jerome Foundation/SASE award (as mentor to poet Elisabeth Workman, grantee, 2009) and two New York Foundation for the Arts fellowships (2007 and 1999).

Works

Poetry
Crossing Second Avenue (ABJ Books, Japan, 1997) 
Half Angel, Half Lunch (HArd PRess, 1998)
Vertigo Seeks Affinities (Belladonna Books, 2006) 
Annoying Diabetic Bitch (Combo Books, 2008)
The Virgin Formica (Hanging Loose Press, 2008)

Fiction 
The Empty Quarter (Hanging Loose Press, 2000) 
Ordinary Time (Hanging Loose Press, 2005) 
Ma Vie a Yonago (Hachette Litteratures, France, 2005)

References

External links
Sharon Mesmer
"She Makes the Dirty Work Look Like a Degas," interview with Geoffrey Cruickshank-Hagenbuckle for Hyperallergic, March 26, 2017
"All Praise the Women of Menopause," The New York Times, February 11, 2016
"Both Metaphor and Reality: Sharon Mesmer and the Poetics of Flarf," interview with Owen Percy, The Poetic Front, Vol. 2, No. 9, 2009
"Beer is Two Subway Stops Away from Mysticism," Sharon Mesmer in conversation with Bart Plantenga for The Brooklyn Rail
Flarf Festival 2006: Sharon Mesmer Reading
"Flarf is Dead, Long Live Post-Flarf" on The Scream Online
"Getting To Know Sharon Mesmer," interview with Daniel Nestor, The Best American Poetry, May 26, 2008
"Is Flarf Corrosive?," podcast of Poemtalk #3 with Ken Goldsmith, Nada Gordon and Steve McLaughlin on Sharon Mesmer's "I Accidentally Ate Some Chicken and Now I'm in Love with Harry Whittington"
"Q & A: American Poetry," Poetry Society of America
Reading at Tribes Gallery for Sensitive Skin magazine, October 5th, 2013
Review of Annoying Diabetic Bitch by D. J. Huppatz, Critical Cities
"Evil Polish Boners & Other Flarf Poems" at Sensitive Skin magazine

American fiction writers
1960 births
Living people
American women essayists
American women poets
American women short story writers
Chapbook writers
New York University faculty
The New School faculty
Columbia College (New York) alumni
Brooklyn College alumni
American people of German descent
American people of Polish descent
Poets from Illinois
Writers from Illinois
Writers from Chicago
20th-century American essayists
21st-century American essayists
20th-century American poets
21st-century American poets
20th-century American short story writers
21st-century American short story writers
20th-century American women writers
21st-century American women writers
American women academics